Sunnybrae Provincial Park is a provincial park in British Columbia, Canada, located on the northern side of the Salmon Arm of Shuswap Lake, near the city of Salmon Arm.
Sunnybrae is a day use park with washrooms, picnic tables, playground and swimming area.

References

Former Provincial Parks of British Columbia
Parks in the Shuswap Country
Protected areas established in 1975
1975 establishments in British Columbia